Harald Marg (born 26 September 1954) is an East German sprint canoeist, born in Magdeburg, who competed from the mid-1970s to the mid-1980s. At the 1980 Summer Olympics in Moscow, he won the gold medal in the K-4 1000 m event.

Marg also won thirteen medals at the ICF Canoe Sprint World Championships with six golds (K-4 500 m: 1978, 1979, 1983; K-4 1000 m: 1978, 1979, 1981), five silvers (K-2 500 m: 1975, K-4 500 m: 1982, K-4 1000 m: 1975, 1982, 1983), and two bronzes (K-4 500 m: 1981, K-4 1000 m: 1973).

References

External links
 
 

1954 births
Sportspeople from Magdeburg
Canoeists at the 1980 Summer Olympics
German male canoeists
Living people
Olympic canoeists of East Germany
Olympic gold medalists for East Germany
Olympic medalists in canoeing
ICF Canoe Sprint World Championships medalists in kayak
Medalists at the 1980 Summer Olympics